South Texas plains may refer to
South Texas region of the U.S. state of Texas
Tamaulipan mezquital an ecoregion in the southern United States and northeastern Mexico
South Plains a region in West Texas
South Plains, Texas a community in northern Floyd County, Texas